Swanepoelspoort Pass, (English: Swanepoel's Gate), or just Swanepoelspoort, is situated in the Eastern Cape, province of South Africa, on the R337 road between Willowmore and Klipplaat.

Mountain passes of the Eastern Cape